HMD may refer to:

Science and technology
 5,10-Methenyltetrahydromethanopterin hydrogenase, an enzyme found in methanogenic archea
 Heavy metal detoxification, the removal of metallic toxic substances from the body
 Hepatic microvascular dysplasia, a disorder where mixing of venous blood and arterial blood in the liver occurs at the microscopic level
 Hereditary mucoepithelial dysplasia, a rare autosomal dominant multiepithelial disorder
 Hexamethylenediamine, an organic compound
 Hoof and mouth disease, an infectious viral disease that affects cloven-hoofed animals
 Hyaline membrane disease, now called infant respiratory distress syndrome
 Head-mounted display, a display device, worn on the head or as part of a helmet
 Helmet-mounted display, for aviation applications
 Human Mortality Database, a joint initiative of the University of California, Berkeley, US and the MPI for Demographic Research in Rostock, Germany

Railway stations
 Hammond station (Louisiana) (Station code), Louisiana, US
 Hampden Park railway station, a railway station in Sussex, England

Other uses
 Heard Island and McDonald Islands
 HMD Global, a Finnish technology company
 Ḥ-M-D, a root of many Arabic and some Hebrew words
 A-Hmao language, spoken in China
 HMD Motorsports, an American racing team

See also
 Havo voor Muziek en Dans, a secondary school in Rotterdam, Netherlands
 Her Majesty's Dockyard
 Hyundai Mipo Dockyard, a South Korea shipbuilding company